VK Primorje Erste Bank (commonly referred to as VK Primorje EB) is a professional water polo club based in Rijeka, Croatia. As of 2021–22 season, the club competes in the Croatian League and Regional League A2.

History
The club was founded in 1908, as HŠK Victoria (Croatian Sports Club Victoria), and is the oldest swimming club in Croatia. Under that name, the club was active until World War II. After the war, the club was re-established in 1948 as Primorje. Since 1991 and the breakup of Yugoslavia the club has been competing in Croatian First League, as well as the regional Adriatic League and LEN Champions League.

VK Primorje EB has won three national championships, the first in 1938 (as HŠK Victoria), and the second and third in the 2013/14 and 2014/15 seasons. Primorje has won three Adriatic League titles, in 2012/13, 2013/14 and 2014/15. Primorje has also won five national cup competitions.

The club has produced many players that have had a significant impact for the Croatia men's national water polo team, including Igor Hinić, Damir Glavan, Damir Burić, and Samir Barać, all of whom have won medals at major international competitions. In addition, the club also produced Danijel Premuš and Vladimir Vujasinović, who went on to win olympic medals for Italy and Serbia respectively.

Venue
The club's home games are held at the newly built Bazeni Kantrida, the venue which hosted the 2008 European Short Course Swimming Championships. The capacity of the new swimming complex is approximately 1,200 and is located within walking distance from HNK Rijeka's football stadium.

Team

Current squad
Season 2019–2020

Technical staff
 Head coach: Igor Hinić
 Assistant coach: /
 Assistant coach: Ivan Matković, prof

Honours

European competitions
LEN Champions League
 Runners-up (2): 2011–12, 2014–15
 Third placed (2): 2003–04, 2013–14
LEN Cup Winners' Cup
 Runners-up (1): 1976–77
 Third placed (2): 1979–80, 1995–96
COMEN Cup
 Winners (1): 1996
Adriatic League
 Winners (3): 2012–13, 2013–14, 2014–15
 Runners-up (2): 2011–12, 2015–16

Domestic competitions 
Croatian League
 Winners (2): 2013–14, 2014–15
 Runners-up (5): 2003–04, 2010–11, 2011–12, 2012–13, 2015–16
Croatian Cup
 Winners (4): 1995–96, 2012–13, 2013–14, 2014–15
 Runners-up (3): 2002–03, 2010–11, 2015–16
Yugoslav League
 Winners (1): 1938
 Runners-up (2): 1978–79, 1982–83
Yugoslav Cup
 Winners (1): 1979
 Runners-up (1): 1976

External links
  

Water polo clubs in Croatia
Primorje